Custodio do Pinho (1638–1697) was a Roman Catholic prelate who served as Titular Bishop of Hierapolis in Isauria (1669–1697), Vicar Apostolic of Malabar (1694–1697), and Vicar Apostolic of Great Mogul (1669–1696).

Biography
Custodio do Pinho was born in  Salsette, Kingdom of Portugal on 3 August 1638.
On 14 January 1669, he was appointed during the papacy of Pope Clement IX as Vicar Apostolic of Great Mogul and Titular Bishop of Hierapolis in Isauria.
On 27 January 1669, he was consecrated bishop. 
On 16 January 1694, he was appointed during the papacy of Pope Innocent XII as Vicar Apostolic of Malabar.
In 1696, he resigned as Vicar Apostolic of Great Mogul. 
He served as Vicar Apostolic of Malabar until his death on 14 April 1697.

References

External links and additional sources
 (for Chronology of Bishops) 
 (for Chronology of Bishops)  
 (for Chronology of Bishops) 
 (for Chronology of Bishops)  

17th-century Roman Catholic bishops in India
Bishops appointed by Pope Clement IX
Bishops appointed by Pope Innocent XII
1638 births
1697 deaths